Yongmunsan is a mountain in the county of Yangpyeong, Gyeonggi-do in South Korea.

See also
 List of mountains in Korea

Notes

References
 

Mountains of Gyeonggi Province
Yangpyeong County
Mountains of South Korea